Shooting was contested at the 2009 Southeast Asian Games in Vientiane, Laos from December 10 to December 18.  Men's and women's competition were held in Air Pistol, Air Rifle, Running Target, Pistol, Prone, Skeet, and Trap.  All competition took place at Shooting Range, National Sports Complex.

Medal summary

Medalists

Men

Note: 

1. Đỗ Đức Hùng of Vietnam finished in third place, however, the bronze medal was awarded to Yoshie Augusta of Indonesia as no country is allowed to win all three medals on offer.

Women

External links
 SEA Games 2009 Official Report
 Result System

Shooting
2009
Southeast Asian Games
Shooting competitions in Laos